The 1975 E3 Harelbeke was the 18th edition of the E3 Harelbeke cycle race and was held on 22 March 1975. The race started and finished in Harelbeke. The race was won by Frans Verbeeck of the Maes Pils team.

General classification

References

1975 in Belgian sport
1975
1975 in road cycling
March 1975 sports events in Europe